Cavolinia labiata is a species of gastropod in the family Cavoliniidae.

References 

Cavoliniidae
Gastropods described in 1835